is a subway station on the  Fukuoka City Subway Nanakuma Line in Sawara-ku, Fukuoka in Japan. Its station symbol is a picture of Camellia flowers in red, floating in the Tsubaki channel.

Lines 
Fukuoka City Subway
Nanakuma Line

Platforms

Vicinity
Route 263
Fukuoka Highway 5
Nishitetsu bus stop
Post office
Daiei
Mochikichi

History
February 3, 2005: Opening of the station

References

Railway stations in Japan opened in 2005
Railway stations in Fukuoka Prefecture
Nanakuma Line